The Daily Show: Indecision is a series of features on The Daily Show with Jon Stewart spoofing US elections.

It may refer to:
The Daily Show: Indecision 2000
The Daily Show: Indecision 2004
The Daily Show: Indecision 2006
The Daily Show: Indecision 2008

See also
Comedy Central's Indecision (disambiguation)